Urogenital peritoneum is a portion of the posterior abdominal peritoneum that is found below the linea terminalis.

It includes the broad ligament of uterus.

References

Pelvis